Gwere may refer to:
Gwere people
Gwere language

Language and nationality disambiguation pages